California Dreamin is an album by saxophonist Bud Shank recorded in 1966 for the World Pacific label.

Reception

AllMusic rated the album with 3 stars.

Track listing
 "California Dreamin'" (John Phillips, Michelle Phillips) - 2:31
 "Imprevu" (Johnny Richards, Lois Geraci) - 2:55
 "Listen People" (Graham Gouldman) - 2:28
 "What the World Needs Now Is Love" (Burt Bacharach, Hal David) - 2:50
 "In Times Like These" (Bacharach, David) - 3:02
 "Norwegian Wood (This Bird Has Flown)" (John Lennon, Paul McCartney) - 2:39
 "Woman" (Bernard Webb) - 2:24
 "Monday, Monday" (John Phillips) - 2:55
 "Daydream" (John Sebastian) - 3:02
 "Gotta Go" (Marty Paich, Rod McKuen) - 2:53
 "The End of the World" (Arthur Kent, Sylvia Dee) - 2:53
 "Husbands & Wives" (Roger Miller) - 3:10

Personnel 
Bud Shank - alto saxophone, flute
Chet Baker - flugelhorn
Unidentified orchestra arranged and conducted by Bob Florence

References 

1966 albums
World Pacific Records albums
Bud Shank albums
Albums arranged by Bob Florence
Albums conducted by Bob Florence